Judi Evans  (also credited as Judi Evans Luciano, born July 12, 1964) is an American actress. 

Evans began her career in daytime in 1983 when she was cast as Becki on Days of Our Lives. She shot to fame shortly after when she was cast as Beth Raines on Guiding Light, for which she won a Daytime Emmy Award at the age of 19. 

In 1986, she left Guiding Light and immediately joined the cast of Days of Our Lives as Adrienne Johnson Kiriakis. In 1991, she took over the role of Paulina Cory Carlino on Another World, a role she would continue until the show ended in 1999. 

She currently recurs as Bonnie Lockhart on Days of Our Lives.

Early Life
Judi Jo Evans was born on July 12th, 1964 while on the road with her family's circus: The Evans Family Circus. By the age of two, she was put to work as the baby clown who greeted patrons arriving to the tent. Her parents were professional trapeze artists and her three older brothers rotated various circus performer roles, including trapeze artists and clowns. Born into a family of entertainers, it's no wonder Evans chose a life in the arts. 

She earned the role of Beth Raines on Guiding Light at just 18 years old and went on to win her first Daytime Emmy Award for Supporting Actress in a Daytime Drama just shy of her 20th birthday. She has worked consistently in soaps since then, with long runs on Guiding Light, Days of Our Lives and Another World. 

Evans was nominated for a Daytime Emmy Award in 2008 for Days of our Lives, 24 years after her first nomination and win for her role on Guiding Light.

Career 
Judi Evans is a professional "soap-hopper" with multiple, successful appearances on four Daytime Soap Operas. 

She began her career, in 1983, on Guiding Light as Beth Raines. In 1986, she moved over to Days of Our Lives to take on the role of Adrienne Johnson-Kiriakis. In 1991, she moved to New York to take over the role of Paulina Cory on Another World. After the conclusion of Another World in 1999, Evans moved back to Los Angeles to begin recurring again on Days of Our Lives, this time taking on double duty as Bonnie Lockhart and Adrienne Johnson-Kiriakis. In 2009, she took on the role of Maeve Stone on As The World Turns. 

She currently recurs as Bonnie Lockhart-Kiriakis on Days of Our Lives opposite her longtime co-star Wally Kurth. 

In addition to her roles in Daytime, Evans has had a very successful television movie career including roles in Getting Away with Murder: The JonBenet Ramsey Mystery, Love is On The Air, I Am Not For Sale: The Fight to End Human Trafficking, and Blood Runs Thick.

She guest-starred on the hit CBS show The Mentalist from 2012-2013 and was a series regular on Venice: The Series playing the role of Logan. She also guest-starred on The Bay: The Series on Amazon Prime in the role of Catherine Blackwell.

Personal 
Evans was born in Montebello, California. In 1993, she married Michael Luciano. They had one son, named Austin Michael Luciano, who died suddenly in late 2019 at age 23.

In 2020, nearly six months after losing her son, Evans contracted COVID-19 while at the hospital recovering from an accidental injury she incurred during horseback riding. Doctors considered amputating both her legs as part of her treatment, but she, luckily, made a full recovery.

A huge animal lover, Evans and her husband own 2 dogs, 3 horses, 1 chicken, and 1 parrot.

Filmography

Awards
Daytime Emmy Awards
(1984) Daytime Emmy Award for Outstanding Supporting Actress in a Drama Series for Guiding Light (Won)
(2008) Daytime Emmy Award for Outstanding Supporting Actress in a Drama Series for Days of our Lives (Nominated)

Soap Opera Digest Awards
(1986) Soap Opera Digest Award Outstanding Daytime Supercouple on a Daytime Serial for Guiding Light (shared with Vincent Irizarry) (Nominated)
(1993) Soap Opera Digest Award Hottest Female Star for Another World (Nominated)
(1998) Soap Opera Digest Award Outstanding Supporting Actress for Another World (Won)
(2005) Soap Opera Digest Award Favorite Return for Days of our Lives (Won)

References

External links

1964 births
Living people
20th-century American actresses
21st-century American actresses
American soap opera actresses
Actresses from California
Daytime Emmy Award winners
Daytime Emmy Award for Outstanding Supporting Actress in a Drama Series winners
Pasadena City College alumni
People from Montebello, California